Under the Sun (V luchakh solnca) is a 2015 Russian documentary film directed by Vitaly Mansky. The film follows a year in the life of a family in Pyongyang, North Korea as their daughter Zin-mi prepares to join the Korean Children's Union on the Day of the Shining Star (Kim Jong-il's birthday). North Korea permitted only Mansky, cinematographer Alexandra Ivanova, and a sound assistant to visit the country. North Korean authorities objected to the film's screening after discovering that the film crew had smuggled unapproved footage. Under the Sun received mostly positive reviews from critics.

Synopsis 

The film follows a year in the life of a family in Pyongyang, North Korea as their daughter Zin-mi prepares to join the Korean Children's Union on the Day of the Shining Star (Kim Jong-il's birthday).

The film opens with the words, "The script of this film was assigned to us by the North Korean side. They also kindly provided us with an around-the-clock escort service, chose our filming locations and looked over all the footage we shot to make sure we did not make any mistakes in showing the life of a perfectly ordinary family in the best country in the world."

Production 
Mansky conceived the project as a film set in a country similar to the Soviet Union. He envisioned the film to be "a time machine" to the Soviet Union under Stalin, and means to better understand his country's history. Prior to the project, Mansky stated that he had not previously visited North Korea and "only knew what most of us knew". After visiting the country, Mansky felt that North Korea was "much more hard and cruel" than the Soviet Union. Mansky observed, "From the outside, it looks like the Soviet Union in the 1930s. But if you look deeper, there is a crucial difference. In the Soviet Union, we had culture - theatres, libraries, films. And the Soviet people were critical thinkers - they complained if there was something they didn’t like. If you compare that to North Korea - they don’t have any of those cultural memories. Everyone looks content, happy with the way things are. This is what I wanted to depict in the documentary."

Russian company Vertov. Real Cinema began negotiations to secure permission to shoot a film in North Korea in 2013. The negotiations with the North Korean Ministry of Culture lasted two years. The project was finalized as a portrait of an 8-year-old school girl named Zin-mi, and her family in Pyongyang, focusing on her preparing to join the Korean Children's Union on the Day of the Shining Star (Kim Jong-il's birthday). The film makers received permission to make one research trip to North Korea, and were granted three different shooting periods of 15 days each. Per the contract, the Ministry of Culture would oversee and approve of every aspect of the filming process. They created the script, selected each of the characters, and approved of the cameras and scenes to be used in the film. Director Vitaly Mansky and his crew would only be permitted to film approved scenes at specific locations designated by the government. The film crew would also be accompanied by North Korean handlers supervising the production. Producer Simone Baumann described the process as "unbearable" for Mansky as he was used to having complete creative freedom on his projects. She stated that Mansky "couldn’t leave his hotel room without a Korean official following after him".

After arriving in North Korea, Mansky was not permitted to go anywhere by himself, and could not directly speak with any of the characters. Realizing that the North Korean government intended to make a propaganda film, Mansky decided to keep the cameras rolling between shots. The film crew captured footage of North Korean handlers staging scenes and instructing characters on how to behave and what dialogue to say. At this point, Mansky decided to change the concept of the film and use the unapproved footage to make a behind-the-scenes exposé.

The film was initially financed by Vertov.Real Cinema. Later, funding was provided by Saxonia Entertainment and MDR from Germany, and Hypermarket Films from the Czech Republic. Per the contract with the North Korean government, the North Korean Ministry of Culture received credit as a co-producer, although they did not provide any financial support for the film.

Filming 

North Korea permitted only Mansky, cinematographer Alexandra Ivanova, and a sound assistant to visit the country. Unknown to North Korean authorities, Mansky hired a Russian translator who was fluent in Korean, but had no experience in sound recording, to act as the sound assistant. Mansky explained, "She [the translator] was our spy. It helped us know what they [the North Korean handlers] were planning for us." Mansky and his crew made three trips to North Korea, spending a total of two months in the country. Although the film makers had initially been granted three different shooting periods, North Korean officials cancelled the scheduled third visit citing the ebola outbreak. Baumann said about the cancelled visit, "Personally, I think they didn’t like us shooting with any kind of slight aggravation." Baumann revealed that Mansky would get so frustrated with his North Korean handlers repeatedly instructing him on how to film, and would sometimes turn the camera and begin filming them.

At the end of each day's shoot, authorities would review the footage and delete scenes they deemed unacceptable. To get around this censorship and record unscripted moments, Mansky allowed digital cameras to roll throughout the shoot even after North Korean handlers yelled "cut". The crew employed a recording system that recorded all footage on two separate memory cards. The crew submitted one of the memory cards to North Korean authorities for inspection and hid the other copy. According to producer Simone Baumann, "The camerawoman is very brave. She put [the memory card] in her trousers when she went to the toilet. They gave one of them to the North Koreans, and the second one they took with them." The film crew then smuggled the footage out of North Korea.

The version of the film containing scenes approved by North Korea is 60 minutes long, while the "director's cut" featuring unapproved footage is 106 minutes.

Reception
North Korean authorities objected to the film's screening after discovering that the film crew had smuggled unapproved footage. The North Korean government lodged a complaint with the Russian Foreign Ministry, which was a production partner, seeking a ban on screenings of the film. Despite objection by some nationalist Russian politicians who support North Korea, the request was rejected by Russia and the film has been screened at film festivals in the country.

Following the film's release, Zin-mi's family condemned the project claiming that it was made dishonestly and edited in a selective way to produce an "anti-North Korean movie." The family also claimed that it was Mansky who staged their daughter's scenes. Zin-mi's mother stated, "Vitaly Mansky directed her [Zin-mi], told her, do this, do that. We thought he was making the documentary for the purpose of a friendly cultural exchange. We did not know Mansky was such a black-minded person."

The film has been screened at several film festivals around the world. The film was released in theatres in Russia, South Korea and other countries. The film had a limited theatrical release in the United States on 6 July 2016, and grossed a total of $105,036 from 6 theatres, before its run ended on 26 February 2017. The film festival curator at the Museum of Modern Art in New York City chose not to screen Under the Sun, fearing the possibility of a cyber-attack by North Korean hackers similar to the one in response to The Interview. Museum spokeswoman Margaret Doyle later stated that the museum had disavowed its previous decision and the curator was no longer employed by the museum.

Critical reception
Under the Sun received mostly positive reviews from critics. The review aggregator Rotten Tomatoes reported 94% favorable reviews based on 32 critics, with an average rating of 7.7/10. On Metacritic, the film received a rating of 81 out of 100, based on 14 critics, indicating "universal acclaim".

Robert Boynton of New York University, author of a book on the North Korean abductions of Japanese citizens called The Invitation-Only Zone, said "This film confirms the reality that everything is stage-managed. That whatever we see is what they want us to see, that people's lines are fed to them, that everything is choreographed." Boynton also stated that he did not believe that Zin-mi's family would suffer any consequences because of the film, adding "I think the biggest fallout would be probably for, certainly the people who negotiated and allowed Mansky to enter the country, and secondly to the minders who guided his crew. They might be in trouble."

Awards and nominations

References

External links
 
 
 Deckert Distribution
 Icarus Films

Documentary films about North Korea
Films set in North Korea
Films shot in North Korea
Russian documentary films
Films critical of communism
German documentary films
Czech documentary films
Latvian documentary films
North Korean documentary films
Golden Kingfisher winners
2015 documentary films
2010s German films